TeleMessage is an Israeli software company based in Petach Tikva, Israel. The company was founded in 1999 by Guy Levit and Gil Shapira. It provides secure enterprise messaging, mobile communications archiving and high-volume text messaging services.

History 
TeleMessage was founded in 1999 in Tel Aviv, Israel raising more than 10 million dollars in its first 2 series of investment rounds. In August 2005, Messaging International PLC acquired TeleMessage. The company then went public and was traded on the London Stock Exchange AIM section under the Messaging International name. The company received conditional funding of up to USD 900,000 for a joint research and development project for "Secure Rich Communication Services Messaging" in 2015. The funding was provided by the Israel-US Binational Industrial Research and Development Foundation. In August 2016, the company delisted from the London Stock Exchange and privatized. In 2017 the company joined the G-Cloud public procurement framework and in June 2020 they joined the financial compliance partner program managed by Verint Systems Inc. (Nasdaq: VRNT) in June 2020.

In 2004, Rogers Wireless selected TeleMessage SMS to Landline solution, powered by ScanSoft RealSpeak, for its TXT 2 Landline service. Verizon Wireless an American telecommunications company started using TeleMessage's SMS service to convert typed text messages into audio messages that play to a recipient's landline phone and the service was launched in June 2006. Rogers Communications and the American telco Sprint Nextel are amongst others to launch the mail plugin.

In 2008, Comverse launched the TeleMessage PC2Mobile with a Tier-1 European operator. In 2013, Sprint started selling the TeleMessage offering to allow doctors and clinicians to send HIPAA-compliant texts.

In 2019, TeleMessage along with Boku Identity and Deep Labs joined NICE Actimize’s X-Sight Marketplace and in February 2020, Proofpoint, Inc. a Sunnyvale based enterprise security company partnered with TeleMessage to use their Mobile Archiver service for capturing text, voice and WhatsApp messages. The company is also working with Microsoft in protecting and governing data that is arriving from other Microsoft 365 services.

Products 
Mobile Archiver - addresses mobile phone text and call archiving for compliance, regulatory and eDiscovery response requirements. It reduces risk across a variety of industries, capturing mobile content from BYOD and corporate phones; Enabling the captures and archive of: SMS, MMS, Voice calls, as well as WhatsApp and WeChat chats and calls.
Secure Enterprise Messaging - enables secure enterprise chat for co-workers by using user-friendly mobile apps and a range of APIs that connect to any operational IT system.
Mass Messaging - provides tools to deliver multi and omnichannel bulk messaging across: SMS, MMS, Voice calls, Faxes, Email, and Mobile Apps.

Patents
Mobile station (MS) message selection identification system
Controller for use with communications systems for converting a voice message to a text message

Awards
2020, Best Regtech Solution by Finovate Awards.

See also

 Comparison of instant messaging clients
 Internet privacy
 Secure instant messaging

References

External links

Companies listed on the London Stock Exchange
Software companies of Israel
Telecommunications companies of Israel
Companies based in Petah Tikva